Frank Pollack (born November 5, 1967) is an American football coach and former player who is the offensive line coach and run game coordinator for the Cincinnati Bengals of the National Football League (NFL). He was the offensive line coach for the New York Jets (2019–2020), Dallas Cowboys (2015–2017), and Oakland Raiders (2012), and was the assistant offensive line coach for the Cowboys (2013–2014) and the Houston Texans (2007–2011). After five years with the Cowboys, he left in 2018 to join the Bengals for his first stint with them as offensive line coach, for that year only. Paul Alexander replaced Pollack in Dallas. Coincidentally, Alexander had been the offensive line coach for the Bengals since 1994. Pollack played eight seasons in the NFL as offensive tackle and guard for the San Francisco 49ers (1990–1991 and 1994–1997) and Denver Broncos (1992–1993).

NFL playing career

Frank was a sixth-round pick by San Francisco 49ers out of Northern Arizona. He played in the NFL for eight seasons, playing in 90 games at guard and tackle with the 49ers and the Denver Broncos. In 1994 he won Super Bowl XXIX with the 49ers.

References

External links
Oakland Raiders bio Raiders.com
Profile NFL.com
Frank Pollack at Pro-Football-Reference.com

1967 births
American football offensive tackles
Northern Arizona Lumberjacks football players
San Francisco 49ers players
Denver Broncos players
Living people
Houston Texans coaches
Oakland Raiders coaches
Dallas Cowboys coaches
Cincinnati Bengals coaches